Miranda Mikadze (born 18 September 1989) is a Georgian chess player who holds the FIDE title of Woman Grandmaster (WGM, 2016).

Biography
Miranda Mikadze represented Georgia at the European Youth Chess Championships and World Youth Chess Championships, where she won two silver medals: in 2003 in Budva, at the European Youth Chess Championship in the U14 girls age group (behind Anna Muzychuk), and in 2005 in Belfort, at the World Youth Chess Championship in the U16 girls age group (also behind Anna Muzychuk).

She is a multiple-time Georgian Women's Chess Championship participant with the best results in 2010 and 2019, when she finished in 4th place.

Mikadze played for Georgia-2 team in the European Women's Team Chess Championship:
 In 2019, at reserve board in the 22nd European Team Chess Championship (women) in Batumi (+1, =3, -1).

She played for Georgia-2 team in the Women's Chess Olympiad:
 In 2018, at reserve board in the 43rd Chess Olympiad (women) in Batumi (+4, =1, -1).

Mikadze played for Batumi chess club Nona in European Women's Chess Club Cup (2014-2016) and won two gold medal in team competition (2014, 2015).

In 2007, she received the FIDE Woman International Master (WIM) title. In 2016, she was awarded the FIDE Woman Grandmaster (WGM) title.

References

External links
 
 
 

1989 births
Living people
Sportspeople from Batumi
Female chess players from Georgia (country)
Chess woman grandmasters
Chess Olympiad competitors